Pacific: The Ocean of the Future is a 2015 non-fiction book by Simon Winchester about the Pacific Ocean.

References

2015 non-fiction books
Pacific Ocean
HarperCollins books
History books about geography